The Kabacan River is a river in the province of Cotabato in the Philippines. It is a tributary of the Pulangi River, discharging at Kayaga, Kabacan, Cotabato.

Flooding
Flooding occurs during heavy rainfall, thunderstorms and typhoon season.

Dam
 Kabacan RIS, National Irrigation Administration (NIA)

Rivers of the Philippines
Landforms of Cotabato